Buckhurst Hill is a London Underground station, in the Epping Forest district of Essex. It is served by the Central line and is between Woodford and Loughton. It is the larger of the two Underground stations in the town of Buckhurst Hill, with Roding Valley station being the smaller. It is the only London Underground station located in Zone 5 but not in a London Borough.

History

The station opened on 22 August 1856 as part of the Eastern Counties Railway branch from London to Loughton. It originally had staggered platforms, with the main buildings on the down side (tracks heading away from London). The 1856 station house survives to the south of the present platforms, but most of the present station dates from 1892, when the entrance was moved to Victoria Road. The building is similar to that at Billericay. Both were designed by W. N. Ashbee, the chief architect of the Great Eastern Railway, of which the station was a part, which was, from 1923, to become part of the London and North Eastern Railway.

The station was transferred to London Underground ownership as part of the New Works Programme, 1935-1940 scheme that saw the electrification of the branch to form part of the Central line. This occurred on 21 November 1948. The station maintains its late Victorian ambiance to a surprising extent.

When the line was electrified a pedestrian underpass was built in order to connect the two parts of Queens Road previously joined by a level crossing. At the same time a pair of exit/entrances to the south of the station were built giving direct access to Lower Queens Road and Queens Road via the new underpass. These exits were closed in 1982, but reopened in May 2018 in order to provide access to the station for mobility impaired passengers.

For the purposes of fare charging it is in Zone 5. As of 2007 it is the only station on the eastern portion of the Central line in that zone. Passengers travelling from the station leaving in either direction must cross a zone boundary.

Gallery

References

External links

http://citytransport.info/BuckhurstHill.htm – Photographs of the Victorian era station platforms, shelters and waiting rooms.

Central line (London Underground) stations
London Underground Night Tube stations
Proposed Chelsea-Hackney Line stations
Tube stations in Essex
Transport in Epping Forest District
Former Great Eastern Railway stations
Railway stations in Great Britain opened in 1856
William Neville Ashbee railway stations